Pyrausta deidamialis is a moth in the family Crambidae. It was described by Herbert Druce in 1895. It is found in Mexico (Xalapa), Costa Rica and Panama.

References

Moths described in 1895
deidamialis
Moths of Central America